Chaos and Brutality is an EP by American thrash metal band Hirax. "Walk with Death" is a re-recorded version of a song off Hirax's 2001 EP, while "100,000 Strong" is the band's first recorded instrumental track. "Lucifer's Infierno Reprise" is a reprised version of the song "Lucifer's Infierno", which appeared on the band's 2007 EP Assassins of War.

Track listing

References 

2007 EPs
Hirax albums
Thrash metal EPs
Speed metal EPs